Phyllonorycter phyllocytisi is a moth of the family Gracillariidae. It is known to be from France, Spain and Italy.

The larvae feed on Cytisus sessilifolius. They mine the leaves of their host plant. They create a lower surface, brownish, tentiform mine that first causes the leaf to fold lengthwise, but in the end contracts the leaf to a shapeless knot. Pupation takes place within the mine.

References

phyllocytisi
Moths of Europe
Moths described in 1936